Ekali is a former municipality in the Ioannina regional unit, Epirus, Greece. Since the 2011 local government reform it has been part of the municipality Zitsa, of which it is a municipal unit. The municipal unit has an area of 49.181 km2. with a population 1,541 (2011). The seat of the municipality was in Metamorfosi.

References

Populated places in Ioannina (regional unit)